Omar the Tentmaker is a 1922 American silent drama film directed by James Young and featuring Guy Bates Post, Nigel de Brulier, Virginia Brown Faire, Noah Beery Sr., Patsy Ruth Miller, and Boris Karloff. It was produced and adapted by Richard Walton Tully from his own 1914 Broadway play Omar the Tentmaker. The film's tagline was "Would You Know How Omar Loved? Would you sweep 1,000 years aside to find Shireen, the Persian Rose, who wed Omar and awoke in the harem of the Shah?" (Print Ad in the Albuquerque Herald, (Albuquerque NM)) 24 May 1923). The film is considered a lost film.

Plot
Omar the Tentmaker (Post) becomes an outcast because of his radical writings and improved calendar (Omar wrote the Iranian first solar calendar circa A.D. 1073). Omar's wife Shireen (Faire), whom he secretly married and impregnated, is desired by the Shah (Noah Beery), who has her brought to his harem. She repulses the Shah and is thrown into prison, where she gives birth to a daughter. The daughter Little Shireen is smuggled out of the prison and brought to Omar Khayyam, although he does not know the baby is his daughter.

Omar has been wandering about in a rage. He is arrested for harboring a Christian Crusader (Flynn). When Omar is about to be tortured, his wife, who has finally escaped from prison, recognizes him and sends for the Grand Vizier, who is a former associate of Omar's. Omar is freed and finally finds happiness.

Cast

See also
 Boris Karloff filmography

References

External links

Omar the Tentmaker at SilentEra

Omar the Tentmaker at Virtual History

1922 films
1922 drama films
Silent American drama films
American silent feature films
American black-and-white films
Films directed by James Young
American films based on plays
First National Pictures films
1920s American films